Achaicus may refer to:
Lucius Mummius Achaicus, a 2nd-century BCE Roman statesman and general
Achaicus of Corinth,  who according to the Bible, carried a letter from the Corinthians to St. Paul, and from St. Paul to the Corinthians